is a former Japanese football player. He played for Japan national team.

Club career
Furukawa was born in Osaka Prefecture on July 5, 1934. After graduating from Kansai University, he joined Dunlop Japan in 1957.

National team career
In June 1956, when Furukawa was a Kansai University student, he was selected for the Japan national team for the 1956 Summer Olympics qualification. At this qualification, on June 3, he debuted against South Korea. In November, he played in the 1956 Summer Olympics in Melbourne. He also played in the 1958 Asian Games. He played 19 games for Japan until 1962.

National team statistics

References

External links

 
 Japan National Football Team Database

1934 births
Living people
Kansai University alumni
Association football people from Osaka Prefecture
Japanese footballers
Japan international footballers
Olympic footballers of Japan
Footballers at the 1956 Summer Olympics
Footballers at the 1958 Asian Games
Association football goalkeepers
Asian Games competitors for Japan